Take Me Out was an Australian television dating game show hosted by Joel Creasey and premiered on the Seven Network from 3 September 2018 until 27 November 2018. The show was filmed at Fox Studios Australia.

Take Me Out is essentially based on the same format as Taken Out, a 2008 dating game show developed by FremantleMedia and hosted by James Kerley. International versions of the show began screening in Denmark as Dagens Mand (Today's Man) from 2008, with the Netherlands the first country to use the title "Take Me Out" in 2009. Other successful versions have screened in the United Kingdom and Ireland.

In June 2019, the series was cancelled and would not return for a second season.

Format
The objective of the show is for a single man to obtain a date with one of thirty single women. The women stand on stage underneath thirty white lights, each with a button in front of them. A single man is then brought on stage and tries to persuade the women to agree to a date in a series of rounds, playing a pre-recorded video discussing his background, displaying a skill (such as dancing or playing a musical instrument), or playing another video in which the man's friends or family reveal more about his virtues and philosophy.

At any point during the rounds, the women can press the button in front of them to turn off their light if they do not believe a date with this man would be constructive to their well-being and if this occurs, their area of the stage will turn red. If, at the end of three rounds, there are lights still left on, the bachelor will turn off all but two remaining lights. He will then have a chance to ask one question to the last two women, before choosing which woman he wants to go on the date with by turning off one more light.

Alternatively, if the man had been left with two lights at the end of round 3, he will just ask his question to the two remaining women but if there is only one light left at the end of round 3, he will go on the date with that girl without asking her his question. If all the women turn off their lights before the end of the third round - this is referred to as a blackout - then the man must leave the show without going on a date.

Cast

Flirty Thirty

Single Men

Ratings

References

External links
 
Take Me Out on 7plus

Seven Network original programming
2018 Australian television series debuts
2010s Australian game shows
Australian dating and relationship reality television series